Tyler Coatney Lancaster (born November 3, 1994) is an American football defensive tackle who is a free agent. He played college football at Northwestern, and was signed by the Green Bay Packers as an undrafted free agent in 2018.

Early life and high school
Lancaster was born in Naperville, Illinois and grew up in Romeoville, Illinois. He attended Plainfield East High School, where he played center. Lancaster did not surrender a sack over the three years he played for the Bengals' varsity football team and was named first-team All-State by the Chicago Tribune. He was ranked the sixth-best center in his class by Rivals.com and tenth by Scout.com and a three star prospect by ESPN.com. Lancaster ultimately committed to play college football at Northwestern over offers from Bowling Green, Central Michigan, Eastern Michigan, and Western Michigan.

College career
Lancaster redshirted his first year at Northwestern, during which he switched positions from the offensive line to defensive tackle. He became a three-year starter for the Wildcats, starting the last 39 games of his career, and accumulated 101 total tackles, 18.5 tackles for loss and 3.5 sacks. As a senior, Lancaster was named a team captain and set career highs in 40 tackles, 9.5 tackles for loss, and 2 sacks and was named honorable mention All-Big Ten.

Professional career

Green Bay Packers
Lancaster signed with the Green Bay Packers as an undrafted free agent on April 28, 2018. He was cut by the Packers at the end of training camp and then subsequently re-signed to the team's practice squad. Lancaster was signed to the Packers' active roster on October 6, 2018, and made his NFL debut the following day in a 31–23 loss to the Detroit Lions, appearing on special teams. Lancaster made his first career start on November 25, 2018, recording one tackle in a 17–24 loss to the Minnesota Vikings. In his rookie season, Lancaster appeared in 12 games (5 starts) and made 25 tackles, including one for loss.

In week 8 of the 2019 season against the Kansas City Chiefs, Lancaster forced a fumble on running back LeSean McCoy and recovered the ball in the 31–24 win. In 2019 he played in all 16 games with 10 starts for the Packers during the regular season and recorded 30 tackles, 1.5 sacks, a forced fumble and a fumble recovery and started both of the team's playoff games. On April 25, 2020, the Packers re-signed Lancaster to a one-year contract as an exclusive-rights free agent.

Lancaster re-signed with the Packers on March 30, 2021. He was placed on the reserve/COVID-19 list on September 28, 2021. He was activated on October 9, 2021.

Las Vegas Raiders
Lancaster signed as free agent with the Las Vegas Raiders on May 25, 2022. On August 28, 2022, Lancaster was placed on injured reserve. He was released on September 5, 2022.

NFL career statistics

Regular season

Postseason

References

External links
Las Vegas Raiders bio
Northwestern Wildcats bio

1994 births
Living people
American football defensive tackles
Green Bay Packers players
Las Vegas Raiders players
Northwestern Wildcats football players
People from Romeoville, Illinois
Players of American football from Illinois
Sportspeople from the Chicago metropolitan area